Janet Bell (née Prictoe, born 15 January 1959) is an English former middle-distance runner who specialised in the 800 metres. She won the 1987 AAA Indoor Championships title and went on to finish fifth in the 800m  finals at the 1987 World Indoor Championships and 1988 European Indoor Championships.

Career
As Janet Prictoe, Bell finished third in the 800 metres at the 1977 AAAs Championships. In 1978, she was second in the 800 metres at the UK Championships in 2:04.78, and second at the AAAs Championships in 2:03.11, just one-one hundredth of a second behind the winner Christina Boxer. She went on to compete at the 1978 European Championships, where she was eliminated in the heats. She also finished second at the 1979 AAAs Championships behind Christine Benning.

Bell's third-place finish at the 1981 AAAs Indoor Championships behind Kirsty McDermott and Lorraine Baker would be her last medal at a national championships until she won the 1987 AAAs indoor title in 2:04.18, ahead of Baker. At the 1987 European Indoor Championships, she ran 2:03.24 in her heat to qualify for the final as a fastest loser, where she finished seventh in 2:05.92. A month later at the 1987 IAAF World Indoor Championships in Indianapolis, she ran 2:03.45 to finish second in her heat and improved to 2:02.96 for fifth in the final. Outdoors, she finished third at the UK Championships behind Diane Edwards and Shireen Bailey in 2:02.41, before achieving her lifetime best with 2:01.40 on 11 July at the Crystal Palace in London.

In 1988, Bell finished second at the AAAs Indoor Championships behind Dawn Gandy in 2:06.01, before again reaching the final of the 800m at the European Indoor Championships, finishing fifth in an indoor best of 2:02.70, which at the time ranked her fourth on the British all-time indoor list behind Jane Colebrook, Liz Barnes and Kirsty Wade. She went on to run 2:03.77 to finish fourth at the 1988 UK Championships in June, behind Christina Cahill, Wade and Gandy. At the 1988 AAA Championships/Olympic trials in August 1988, she finished fourth behind Wade, Shireen Bailey and Helen Thorpe.

Competition record

References

External links

1959 births
English female middle-distance runners
Living people